Borealea is a genus of sea slugs, specifically aeolid nudibranchs, marine gastropod molluscs in the family Coryphellidae.

Species 
Species within the genus Borealea are as follows:
 Borealea nobilis (A. E. Verrill, 1880)
 Borealea sanamyanae (Korshunova, Martynov, Bakken, Evertsen, Fletcher, Mudianta, Saito, Lundin, Schrödl & Picton, 2017)

References

External links

Coryphellidae
Gastropod genera